The following lists events that happened during 2014 in Qatar.

Incumbents
Emir: Tamim bin Hamad Al Thani
Prime Minister: Abdullah bin Nasser bin Khalifa Al Thani

Events

September
 September 6 - Egypt charges former president Mohammed Morsi and nine others for leaking sensitive government information to Qatar.

References

 
Years of the 21st century in Qatar
Qatar
2010s in Qatar
Qatar